Dolatpar is a village in Rajkot district, Gujarat, India.

Villages in Rajkot district